Jacques Cuinières (1943 – 8 February 2020) was a French journalist and photographer. He worked for L'Aurore from 1960 to 1980, for Le Quotidien de Paris from 1980 to 1989 and for Le Figaro from 1989 to 2003.

Works
Une semaine à Colombey - Général De Gaulle (1971)
Rudolf Noureev, les images d'une vie (2008)

References

1943 births
2020 deaths
French male journalists
French photographers